Hamilton is a large town in South Lanarkshire, Scotland. It serves as the main administrative centre of the South Lanarkshire council area. It is situated on the south bank of the River Clyde at its confluence with the Avon Water. Hamilton is the county town of the historic county of Lanarkshire and is the location of the headquarters of the modern local authority of South Lanarkshire.

The town itself has a population of around 55,000, which makes it the 8th largest settlement in Scotland. It forms a large urban area with nearby towns of Blantyre, Motherwell, Larkhall and Wishaw.

History
The town of Hamilton was originally known as Cadzow or Cadyou, the "" being the letter yogh), pronounced /kadju/. It is an ancient settlement, possibly dating back to the days of Strathclyde, or perhaps earlier. The Roman fort of Bothwellhaugh lies nearby. A lost medieval settlement was excavated in the 2010s near the Clyde, only around 1 mile from the current town. It is known that kings of Strathclyde did have a hunting lodge near Cadzow, and the area may have been a royal centre during the later stages of the kingdom, as a precursor to Cadzow Castle.

During the Wars of Scottish Independence the Hamilton family initially supported the English and Walter fitz Gilbert (the head of the Hamilton family) was governor of Bothwell Castle on behalf of the English. However, he later changed loyalty to Robert the Bruce, following the Battle of Bannockburn, and ceded Bothwell to him. For this act, he was rewarded with a portion of land which had been forfeited by the Comyns at Dalserf and later the Barony and lands of Cadzow, which in time would become the town of Hamilton.

Cadzow was renamed Hamilton in the time of James, Lord Hamilton, who was married to Princess Mary, the daughter of King James II. The Hamilton family themselves most likely took their name from the lands of Humbleton or Homildon in Northumberland, or perhaps from a place near Leicester.

The Hamiltons constructed many landmark buildings in the area including the Hamilton Mausoleum in Strathclyde Park, which has one of the longest reverb times of any manmade building at 15 seconds. The Hamilton family are major land-owners in the area to this day. Hamilton Palace was the seat of the Dukes of Hamilton until the early-twentieth century.

Other historic buildings in the area include Hamilton Old Parish Church, a Georgian era building completed in 1734 and the only church to have been built by William Adam. The graveyard of the old parish church contains some Covenanter remains. Hamilton Townhouse, which now houses a library and concert hall, underwent a sympathetic modernization in 2002 and opened to the public in summer 2004. The ruins of Cadzow Castle also lie in Chatelherault Country Park,  from the town centre.

Hamilton Palace was the largest non-royal residence in the Western world, located in the north-east of the town. A former seat of the Dukes of Hamilton, it was built in 1695, subsequently much enlarged, and demolished in 1921 due to ground subsidence. It is widely acknowledged as having been one of the grandest houses in Scotland, was visited and admired by Queen Victoria, and was written about by Daniel Defoe.

Hamilton Barracks was formerly the Depot of the Cameronians (Scottish Rifles) and the home of the 1st Battalion of the Regiment.  The Regimental Museum is part of the Low Parks Museum.

The Low Parks Museum is housed in what was a 16th-century inn and a staging post for journeys between Glasgow and Edinburgh. Recently refurbished, it is the oldest building in Hamilton and is to the north of the Palace Grounds.

Renowned explorer and missionary Dr. David Livingstone's house still stands at 17 Burnbank Road and has a plaque about him.

Governance

Hamilton is located within the Scottish council area of South Lanarkshire. Its local government services are provided by the unitary authority the South Lanarkshire Council, which is headquartered in Hamilton. Hamilton itself is divided between three wards, totalling 11 seats: Hamilton North and East, Hamilton West and Earnock and Hamilton South.

Hamilton is represented in the House of Commons by two Members of Parliament (MPs). The following MPs were elected from Hamilton in 2019:

 Angela Crawley (SNP) in Lanark and Hamilton East, first elected in 2015.
 Margaret Ferrier (Independent) in Rutherglen and Hamilton West, first elected in 2015.

Hamilton is also represented in the Scottish Parliament by two constituency MSPs. The following MSPs were elected from Hamilton in 2021:

 Christina McKelvie (SNP) in Hamilton, Larkhall and Stonehouse, first elected in 2011.
 Stephanie Callaghan (SNP) in Uddingston and Bellshill, first elected at this election, replacing Richard Lyle (SNP). The Uddingston and Bellshill constituency covers the Whitehill and Bothwell Road areas of Hamilton.

Geography

Areas of Hamilton:

 Avongrove
 Burnbank
 Barncluith
 Brackenhill Park
 Earnock Estate
 Earnock Glen
 Ferniegair
 Eddlewood
 Fairhill
 Hamilton West
 High Earnock
 Hillhouse
 Laighstonehall
 Little Earnock
 Low Waters
 Meikle Earnock
 Neilsland
 Silvertonhill
 Torheads Farm
 Udston
 Whitehill
 Woodhead

Nearby towns and cities:

 Glasgow 
 Strathaven 
 East Kilbride 
 Motherwell 
 Edinburgh 
 Carlisle 
 Larkhall 

Hamilton is twinned with Châtellerault in France. This connection dates from the 16th century when the title Duc de Châtellerault was conferred on James Hamilton, 2nd Earl of Arran. The Duke's Chatelherault Hunting Lodge (now in Chatelherault Country Park), a primary school and new railway station are named 'Chatelherault' for this reason.

Economy
Service industries and local government are major employers in Hamilton, as are Philips, the Dutch electronics conglomerate. The town centre has been regenerated with new indoor shopping centres (the Regent Shopping Centre, New Cross Shopping Centre) Hamilton Retail Park and the Palace Grounds Retail Park.

Restaurants and national retail outlets are situated in a redeveloped part of the Palace Grounds that are visible upon entering the town from the M74 motorway. The creation of a circular town square has resulted in Hamilton receiving numerous town planning awards during the past decade. This development transformed the Hamilton side of Strathclyde Park, which was the original site of the Duke's palace. 
Hamilton has been a Fairtrade Town since 2005.

Transport
Hamilton has three railway stations, Hamilton Central, Hamilton West and Chatelherault on the Argyle Line's Hamilton Circle. Hamilton Central is 22 minutes from Glasgow on the limited stop Larkhall-Dalmuir service. It was once served by the North British Railway, which had three stations in the area. Hamilton (NBR), Peacock Cross railway station and Burnbank.

Beside Hamilton Central lies Hamilton bus station, providing links to surrounding towns and cities, also offering an express bus to Glasgow and also some parts of England. Major roads in the town include the A72 running south-east to Larkhall, the A723 south to Strathaven / north-east to Motherwell, and the A724 west towards Rutherglen, while to the west at Blantyre, the A725 dual carriageway connects the area to East Kilbride, Coatbridge and the M8. By road the town is to the west of the M74 motorway, the main southerly link to England, which joins the M6 just north of Carlisle. The main route from Edinburgh is the M8, leaving at junctions 6 or 7.

Cycling paths run from Strathclyde Park to Chatelherault Country Park following the banks of the Clyde and Avon. These are being expanded at part of the Sustrans Connect2 project and will make up part of the National Cycle Route 74 which will run from Uddingston to Carlisle, Cumbria

Education
There are currently three comprehensive high schools in the town – Hamilton Grammar, Holy Cross and St.John Ogilvie. The former Earnock High School merged with Blantyre High School as the new Calderside Academy. Hamilton also has one private school, Hamilton College, next to the Hamilton Park Racecourse.

There are also several primary schools in Hamilton, including, St Cuthbert's, Our Lady and St Anne's, St Elizabeth's, St Peter's, St Paul's, St Mark's, St Ninian's, St Mary's, Glenlee, Townhill, Udston, Woodhead, Beckford, St John's, Woodside and Chatelherault Primary Schools.

Hamilton is a university town with The University of the West of Scotland campus formerly sited on Almada Street, but now relocated to Hamilton International Technology Park in High Blantyre.

Sports

Hamilton Academical Football Club (the Accies) was formed in 1874 and is one of Scotland's oldest senior clubs. It takes its name from Hamilton Academy, now called Hamilton Grammar School, the oldest school in the town (founded 1588). It is the only professional football team in the UK to originate from a school team and they currently play in the Scottish Championship. Their stadium is New Douglas Park, built in 2001 near the site of the former ground Douglas Park (which was demolished in 1994 to make way for a retail park).

Hamilton Rugby Club are based at the Laigh Bent sports ground, Bent Road. They currently play in Scottish Premiership Division 2. Hamilton Park Racecourse is situated alongside Bothwell Road. Hamilton Harriers are a local Road Running Club, they currently meet outside the Sports Club in nearby town of Uddingston during the week and at the weekend at Strathclyde Country Park.

There are a number of high quality football, rugby, cricket and bowling areas in the Hamilton Palace Sports Grounds alongside the Mausoleum. Strathclyde Park provides access to world class water-sport facilities and Strathclyde Park Golf Course. Hamilton Golf Club (dating from 1892) is situated across the Avon Water in nearby Ferniegair.

Hamilton Lawn Tennis Club provides the town with a set of four floodlit artificial grass tennis courts based at Blackswell Lane. The town is also now home to a Virgin Active Health Club, which hosted the tennis at the 2011 International Children's Games. In recent years the Virgin Active men's tennis team have won the Men's Scottish cup twice (2011, 2012) becoming the first team attached to a commercial chain health club to win the trophy in its history.

Speedway racing was staged in Hamilton at the annual Lanarkshire Show from 1947 to 1955 on the old ash football pitches of Strathclyde Park (now covered by the town square).

Entertainment
Hamilton Townhouse Theatre is a 712-seat venue in the Cadzow Street area of the town. It is the first cultural venue in Scotland to attain the prestigious Quest accreditation. A multiplex Vue Cinema is located in the redeveloped Palace Grounds area close to the ROC nightclub.

Notable people

Science and exploration
 Charles Alston (Botanist)
 Matthew Baillie (Scientist) (attended the local grammar school)
 William Cullen (Physician & Chemist)
 David Livingstone (Explorer and missionary) (Born in Blantyre and lived in Hamilton as an adult.)
 John Roberton (Physician and controversial social reformer)
 John Roberton (Obstetrician and social reformer)

Business and politics
 W. G. S. Adams (Political scientist)
 Alexander Cairncross (Economist) (educated at Hamilton Academy)
 Alexander Cullen (architect)
 Doug Finley (Canadian Senator and principal operational strategist of the Conservative Party of Canada) 
 William Logan (Philanthropist)
 Margo MacDonald (Politician)
 Sir George Arthur Mitchell (Businessman)
 Iain Stewart (Politician)

Art and literature
 Joanna Baillie (Poet) (lived in the town as a child)
 Martin Boyce (Artist)
 David Carlyle (Actor)
 Thomas Clark (Writer)
 Robin Jenkins (Novelist) (attended Hamilton Academy)
 John Mather (Artist)
 Martin Stepek (Writer)

Sport
 Jim Bett (Aberdeen & Scotland Footballer)
 Craig Brown (Scotland football manager and former Aberdeen FC Manager)
 Jamie Burnett (snooker professional)
 Davie Cooper (Clydebank, Rangers, Motherwell & Scotland Footballer)
 Barry Ferguson (Rangers & Scotland Captain)
 Steven Fletcher (Wolves & Scotland footballer)
 Elenor Gordon (Swimmer)
 Paul Hartley (Dundee Manager & Scotland footballer)
 David Herd (Arsenal, Manchester United & Scotland footballer)
 John Paul McBride (St. Johnstone footballer)
 Walter McGowan (World Champion Boxer)
 Paul McStay (Celtic & Scotland footballer)
 Jackie Oakes (Blackburn Rovers F.C., Manchester City F.C. and Queen of the South F.C. footballer)
 Phil O'Donnell (Motherwell, Celtic, Sheffield Wednesday & Scotland footballer)
 Bobby Shearer (Rangers & Scotland footballer)
 Jock Stein (Celtic & Scotland Manager) born Burnbank
 John Fox Watson (Real Madrid & Fulham footballer)

Entertainment and broadcasting
 Jackie Bird (Broadcaster) (attended school in Hamilton)
 Laurie Brett (Eastenders Actress)
 Ian Buchanan (Emmy Award Winning Actor)
 Brian Connolly (Musician)
 Patricia Dainton (Actress)
 Sir Harry Lauder (Entertainer) (lived in Hamilton)
 Allan Lee (Film editor)
 Marie McLaughlin (Opera Singer)
 Mark McManus (Taggart Actor)
 James MacPherson (Taggart Actor)
 Nicol Williamson (Actor, Tony Award nominee)

See also
Hamilton Advertiser
List of places in South Lanarkshire
 Hamilton United Reformed Church

 Hamilton Circle Railway Line
 National Cycle Route 74

References

External links

 Hamilton on VisitScotland
 Hamilton Palace – A virtual reconstruction
 Hamilton Through the Ages: Images of Our Town
 Historic Hamilton

 
Towns in South Lanarkshire
Large burghs
Former county towns in Scotland
Civil parishes of Scotland